Eivar may refer to:
Eivar, North Khorasan, a village in Iran
Eivar Widlund (1905-1968), Swedish footballer